George King (5 January 1923 – 2009) was an English footballer. A forward, he scored 59 goals in 164 league games in a seven-year career in the Football League. He was the brother of goalkeepers Frank and Ray King.

He began his career with Newcastle United following the conclusions of World War II, and had a brief spell with Hull City, before joining Port Vale in April 1949. He impressed for the "Valiants", and was sold on to Barrow for a four-figure fee in February 1950. He scored more than half of his career goals for the "Bluebirds", before he enjoyed brief stays with Bradford City and Gillingham. He later played for non-league clubs King's Lynn and Ely City.

Career
King played for the Royal Air Force during World War II. During the war he narrowly escaped death when he was aboard a ship that was sunk by a U-boat. He signed with Newcastle United in 1945, despite interest from Burnley. He played two Second Division games in 1946–47, before injury restricted his progress. He swapped St James' Park for Boothferry Park when he transferred to Hull City. He spent 1947–48 and 1948–49 with Hull City, featuring in three Third Division North games for Raich Carter's "Tigers".

He joined Port Vale for a four-figure fee in April 1949. He scored twice on his debut, a 3–1 win over Torquay United at The Old Recreation Ground on 23 April. He scored three goals in eight Third Division South games in 1949–50, but lost his place in October 1949. He was sold on to Barrow for a four-figure fee in February 1950 by manager Gordon Hodgson. He scored 35 goals in 86 Third Division North games for Jack Hacking's "Bluebirds", before leaving Holker Street for Bradford City on a £4,500 transfer. He scored nine times in 23 games for Ivor Powell's "Bantams" in 1952–53 in a brief stay at Valley Parade. He later scored five goals in 21 Third Division South games for Archie Clark's Gillingham. He left Priestfield and the Football League, and played for United Counties League side King's Lynn, before he was appointed player-coach at Cambridgeshire League side Ely City, becoming the club's first manager in June 1955. He led the club to the First Round of the FA Cup in 1956–57, at which point they lost out to Torquay United. After retiring, he became a chiropodist. He died in 2009, having suffered with alzheimer's disease.

Career statistics
Source:

References
Specific

General
 

1923 births
2009 deaths
People from Warkworth, Northumberland
Footballers from Northumberland
English footballers
Association football forwards
Royal Air Force personnel of World War II
Newcastle United F.C. players
Hull City A.F.C. players
Port Vale F.C. players
Barrow A.F.C. players
Bradford City A.F.C. players
Gillingham F.C. players
King's Lynn F.C. players
Ely City F.C. players
English Football League players
English football managers
Ely City F.C. managers
Deaths from dementia in the United Kingdom
Deaths from Alzheimer's disease